Faizganj is a town and a nagar panchayat in Budaun district  in the state of Uttar Pradesh, India.

Demographics
 India census, Faizganj had a population of 10,036. Males constitute 54% of the population and females 46%. Faizganj has an average literacy rate of 34%, lower than the national average of 59.5%: male literacy is 42%, and female literacy is 24%. In Faizganj, 21% of the population is under 6 years of age.

References

Cities and towns in Budaun district